The 1867 Virgin Islands earthquake and tsunami occurred on November 18, at 2.45 p.m. in the Anegada Trough about 20 km southwest of Saint Thomas, Danish West Indies (now U.S. Virgin Islands). The  7.5 earthquake came just 20 days after the devastating San Narciso Hurricane in the same region. Tsunamis from this earthquake were some of the highest ever recorded in the Lesser Antilles. Wave heights exceeded  in some islands in the Lesser Antilles. The earthquake and tsunami resulted in no more than 50 fatalities, although casualties in the hundreds is also claimed.

Tectonic setting 
The U.S.Virgin Islands are part of the Greater Antilles that lies parallel to the Puerto Rico Trench; an oblique subduction zone where the North American Plate is underthrusted beneath the Caribbean Plate along the Lesser Antilles subduction zone transits to strike-slip along the Septentrional-Oriente fault zone. Because of this transition, the overriding Caribbean Plate begins to extend, and normal faults starts to break out as a result. Subduction and shallow crustal faults pose earthquake and tsunami risk to the area, although the Lesser Antilles megathrust has not seen any major earthquake along its subduction interface. A possible earthquake along the megathrust may have been the  8.3, 1843 Guadeloupe earthquake.

Earthquake 
The earthquake consisted of two shocks, 10 minutes apart, and the two tsunamis came 10 minutes after each shock. Shaking reportedly lasted a minute in Frederiksted, where the earthquake stirred a dust cloud that blanketed the town. Shaking reached intensity IX on the Rossi–Forel scale in the Danish West Indies. Rossi–Forel IX-level shaking was also felt on the British Virgin Islands, Puerto Rico and U.S. Virgin Islands. Survivor accounts stated that there were two distinct shocks 10–15 minutes apart. On the Modified Mercalli intensity scale, the intensity ranged from VIII (Severe) to X (Extreme).

An aftershock with a magnitude of  6.5 occurred on March 17, 1868. There is uncertainty about its timing of occurrence, either 07:15 or 19:15 local time as several reports documented it happening in the morning while one reported it in the "evening". Most likely it occurred in the morning and "evening" was a typographical error. It was felt with a maximum Modified Mercalli intensity of VII (Very strong) and a  tsunami accompanied the shock.

Tsunami 

At Saint Thomas, the first wave was described as a "straight white wall, about 15 to 23 feet (4.6 to 7.0 meters)" which advanced to the harbor, 10 minutes after the earthquake. The wave picked up steamers along the way and broke to just a few feet in front of the town. A smaller wave came shortly and penetrated further in the island. Thirty people perished when the waves swept them away. The La Plata, a steamship serving the Royal Mail Steam Packet Company was swamped by the tsunami, killing nearly all of its crew on board.

A US Navy ship which had arrived the day before, the USS De Soto, was ripped from her moorings and beached. The second wave then brought the ship with her bottom seriously damaged back to sea.

At Christiansted, Saint Croix, the 7–9-meter waves drowned five people and inundated the island up to 90 meters inland. The tsunami destroyed 20 houses and stranded numerous boats inland. In some parts of the island, the waves reached a run-up height of 14.6 meters. Frederiksted on the same island was hit by waves up to 7.6 meters. The surging seawater beached many vessels including a US Navy ship, USS Monongahela along the beaches of Frederiksted. The tsunami waves were 12 meters on Water Island.

In Antigua, the sea level rose  at Saint John harbor.

Deshayes was hit with very high waves, an estimated  in height and a length of 5 km. The tsunami swept away many personal belongings and items. In Saint-Rose however, the waves were determined to be no more than  when a church said to house fleeing survivors located 10 meters above sea-level remained undamaged.

In Puerto Rico, wave heights of  meters swept through the island's coast. A parish church in Bayamón barrio-pueblo was damaged as a result of the earthquake.

Scientific analysis
Little research has been made to study the earthquake and tsunami in detail. Tsunami deposits on Saint Thomas left in salt ponds and lagoons have not been extensively studied. This despite the fact that the Caribbean has over 124 reported tsunamis or tsunami-like events since 1498, 27 of them have resulted in fatalities.

The source of the earthquake is located in the Anegada Passage. The rupture may have initiated at a depth of 3 km along this thrust fault. An underwater landslide triggered by movement on the seafloor would likely be the primary source of the tsunami as the run-up heights of the tsunami were unusually high, and these waves arrived almost immediately after the quake. Another simulation of the earthquake and tsunami suggest the rupture was only 50 km in length, corresponding to a  7.2 earthquake.

See also 
 List of earthquakes in the Caribbean
List of earthquakes in Puerto Rico
2019–20 Puerto Rico earthquakes

References 

1867 earthquakes
Tsunamis in the United States
Earthquakes in the Caribbean
Earthquakes in Denmark
Earthquakes in Puerto Rico
1867 disasters in the United States
1867 floods
1867 in the British Empire
1867 in Puerto Rico
1867 in the British Virgin Islands
1867 in the Caribbean
Natural disasters in the British Virgin Islands
Natural disasters in British Overseas Territories
1867 natural disasters in the United States
Maritime incidents in November 1867
1867 disasters in North America